Maxwell Chambers House (also called Utzman-Chambers House) is a historic home located at Salisbury, Rowan County, North Carolina.  It was built between 1814 and 1819, and is a two-story, three bay, Federal-style frame townhouse. It has three interior end chimneys and a one-story full-width shed roofed front porch with Doric order columns.

It was listed on the National Register of Historic Places in 1972. It is located in the Salisbury Historic District.

Cabinetmaker Lewis Utzman bought the site in 1814 from Charles Fisher for $100 and sold it to Judge James Martin for $1026 in 1819. It is believed the house was built for Utzman between these two dates, possibly by Jacob Utzman, who may have been a relative. 

The house became the Rowan County museum prior to 1979 and was used for that purpose until the museum moved to the former courthouse in 2001.

Maxwell Chambers
It was the home of Maxwell Chambers (1780-1855), a slave owner, planter and manufacturer in Salisbury.  He was also a representative from the Salisbury District in the North Carolina House of Commons in 1779, 1789, and 1790.

References

Houses on the National Register of Historic Places in North Carolina
Federal architecture in North Carolina
Houses completed in 1819
Houses in Salisbury, North Carolina
National Register of Historic Places in Rowan County, North Carolina
Individually listed contributing properties to historic districts on the National Register in North Carolina